Alhassan Mumuni (born 23 September 1967) is a Ghanaian politician and member of the Seventh Parliament of the Fourth Republic of Ghana representing the Salaga North Constituency in the Northern Region on the ticket of the National Democratic Congress.

Early life 
Mumuni was born on 23 September 1967 at Gbung in the northern region of Ghana.

Education 
Mumuni attended the University of Education, Winneba, and graduated with a Bachelor of Education degree.

Personal life 
Mumuni is a Muslim, and is married with six children.

Politics 
Mumuni is a member of the National Democratic Congress (NDC). In 2012, he contested for the Salaga North seat on the ticket of the NDC sixth parliament of the fourth republic and won.

Employment 
 Ghana Education Service (Circuit Supervisor, Rural North ‘B’ Circuit Salaga)
 DCE (East Gonja District) April, 2009–January, 2013

References

Ghanaian MPs 2017–2021
1967 births
Living people
Ghanaian Muslims
National Democratic Congress (Ghana) politicians